The 2010 Shanghai Rolex Masters was a men's tennis tournament  played on outdoor hard courts. It was the second edition of the Shanghai ATP Masters 1000, classified as an ATP World Tour Masters 1000 event on the 2010 ATP World Tour. It took place at Qizhong Forest Sports City Arena in Shanghai, China. This edition was held from October 9 to October 17, 2010. Fourth-seeded Andy Murray won the singles title.

Entrants

Seeds

 Rankings are as of October 4, 2010.

Other entrants
The following players received wildcards into the singles main draw:
  Wu Di
  Bai Yan
  Yang Tsung-hua
  Zhang Ze

The following players received entry from the qualifying draw:
  Kevin Anderson
  Benjamin Becker
  Jérémy Chardy
  Marsel İlhan
  Łukasz Kubot
  Florent Serra
  Mischa Zverev

The following players received entry as a Lucky loser into the singles main draw:
  Daniel Gimeno Traver

Finals

Singles

 Andy Murray defeated  Roger Federer, 6–3, 6–2.
It was Murray's 2nd title of the year and 16th of his career. It was his 6th Masters 1000 title of his career.

Doubles

 Jürgen Melzer /  Leander Paes defeated  Mariusz Fyrstenberg /  Marcin Matkowski, 7–5, 4–6, [10–5].

References

External links
Official website

 
Shanghai Rolex Masters
Shanghai Masters (tennis)
Shanghai Rolex Masters
Shanghai Rolex Masters